Marco De Vito (born 14 January 1991) is an Italian football defender. He plays for Lucchese.

Career
On 17 September 2013, De Vito joined Dukla Banská Bystrica.

On 29 November 2019, he signed with Serie C club Rimini.

On 29 September 2020, he returned to Lucchese.

References

External links

1991 births
Sportspeople from the Province of Catanzaro
Living people
Italian footballers
Association football defenders
NK Imotski players
FK Dukla Banská Bystrica players
S.S.D. Lucchese 1905 players
Rimini F.C. 1912 players
A.S.D. Villafranca players
S.S.D. Marsala Calcio players
U.S. Folgore Caratese A.S.D. players
Reggina 1914 players
S.S. Monopoli 1966 players
Serie D players
First Football League (Croatia) players
Slovak Super Liga players
Serie C players
Italian expatriate footballers
Expatriate footballers in Croatia
Expatriate footballers in Slovakia
Footballers from Calabria